This is a continued list of Nintendo Switch games.

List
There are currently  games across List of Nintendo Switch games (0–9 and A), List of Nintendo Switch games (B), List of Nintendo Switch games (C–G), List of Nintendo Switch games (H–P), and this page (Q–Z).

References

Switch
Nintendo Switch